Rakovac is a village in the municipality of Raška, Serbia. According to the 2002 census, the village has a population of 240 people.

References

Populated places in Raška District